The  West Bengal Council of Rabindra Open Schooling is the board of education for distance education, which is administered by the government of West Bengal.

References

Education in West Bengal
State secondary education boards of India
1997 establishments in West Bengal
Memorials to Rabindranath Tagore
State agencies of West Bengal
Distance education in India
Educational boards based in Kolkata